Eraser: Reborn is an American action thriller film, and serves as a reboot of the 1996 Eraser, and is described as the next installment in the franchise. Directed by John Pogue from a script by Michael D. Weiss, the plot centers around a secret agency that specializes in engineering the fake deaths of witnesses that need to leave no trace of their existence. Starring British actor Dominic Sherwood in the lead role as U.S. Marshal Mason Pollard; the supporting cast includes Jacky Lai, McKinley Belcher III and Eddie Ramos.

Plot
U.S. Marshal Mason Pollard specializes in "erasing" people - faking the deaths of high-risk witnesses. With the technological advances of the last 25 years, the game has upgraded, and it's just another day at the office when he's assigned to Rina Kimura, a crime boss' wife who's decided to turn state's evidence. As the two flee to Cape Town, South Africa, with a team of merciless assassins on their trail, Pollard discovers he's been set up. Double-crossed and fueled by adrenaline, he needs to be at the top of his game, or he'll be the one who's erased. Permanently.

Cast

 Dominic Sherwood as U.S. Marshal Mason Pollard
 Jacky Lai as Rina Kimura
 McKinley Belcher III as Paul Whitlock
 Eddie Ramos as Sugar Jax

Production
In September 2021, a sequel, which became the reboot of Eraser instead,  was announced to be in development with Dominic Sherwood in the lead role. John Pogue was announced as director with a script written by Michael D. Weiss. Jacky Lai will co-star in the movie, while the supporting cast will include McKinley Belcher III and Eddie Ramos. Hunt Lowry and Patty Reed serve as producers. The project is a joint-venture production between Warner Bros. Home Entertainment Group and Roserock Films. Production took place secretly with principal photography commencing in mid-2021. The film was distributed by Warner Bros. Home Entertainment.

Release

Theatrical
Eraser: Reborn premiered in German theatres on March 31, 2022.

Home media and streaming
Domestically, Eraser: Reborn was released directly to home media on June 7, 2022. It will later stream on HBO Max in the fall of 2022.

References

External links
 

2022 action films
2022 direct-to-video films
2020s chase films
2020s English-language films
American action thriller films
American chase films
Direct-to-video action films
Films about witness protection
Films directed by John Pogue
Reboot films
United States Marshals Service in fiction
Warner Bros. direct-to-video films
2020s American films